The intermetacarpal joints are in the hand formed between the metacarpal bones. The bases of the second, third, fourth and fifth metacarpal bones articulate with one another by small surfaces covered with cartilage. The metacarpal bones are connected together by dorsal, palmar, and interosseous ligaments.
 The dorsal metacarpal ligaments (ligamenta metacarpalia dorsalia) and palmar metacarpal ligaments (ligamenta metacarpalia palmaria) pass transversely from one bone to another on the dorsal and palmar surfaces.
 The interosseous metacarpal ligaments (ligamenta metacarpalia interossea) connect their contiguous surfaces, just distal to their collateral articular facets.

The synovial membrane for these joints is continuous with that of the carpometacarpal joints.

Additional images

See also
 Transverse metacarpal ligament

References

Joints